Neue Deutsche Welle (NDW, "New German Wave") is a genre of West German rock music originally derived from post-punk and new wave music with electronic influences. The term was first coined by Dutch radio DJ Frits Spits on the popular nationwide radio station Hilversum 3, which was very popular among German listeners. Soon after that, the term was used in a record-shop advertisement by Burkhardt Seiler in an August 1979 issue of the West German magazine Sounds. It was then used by journalist Alfred Hilsberg in an article about the movement titled  ("New German Wave — From Grey Cities' Walls") in Sounds in October 1979.

History 

The history of the Neue Deutsche Welle consists of two major parts. From its beginnings to 1981, the genre was mostly an underground movement with roots in British punk and new wave music. It quickly developed into an original and distinct style, influenced in no small part by the different sound and rhythm of the German language, which many of the bands had adapted from early on.

The main centers of the NDW movement during these years were West Berlin, Düsseldorf, Hamburg, Hannover and Hagen, as well as, to a lesser extent, the Frankfurt Rhein-Main Region, Limburg an der Lahn and Vienna.

Many one-hit wonders and short-lived bands appeared and were forgotten again in rapid succession. The overly broad application of the NDW label to these bands, as well as to almost any German musicians not using English lyrics, even if their music was apparently not influenced at all by the original NDW sound (including pure rock bands like  or even Udo Lindenberg), quickly led to the decay of the entire genre when many of the original musicians turned their backs in frustration.

Around 1983/1984, the era of the  came to an early end, following the oversaturation of the market with what was perceived as stereotypical, manufactured hits.

A revival of interest in the style in the Anglophone world occurred in 2003, with the release of DJ Hell's compilation New Deutsch. The NDW has come to be acknowledged as a forerunner to later developments in dance-punk, electronic body music and electroclash.

In the 2000s, the term was used by the Berlin-based rap label  to describe a supposed new German rap movement of which they claimed to be a part. This was the subject of  artist Fler's 2005 single .

See also 

 Cold wave
 Dance-punk
 Electropunk
 Neue Deutsche Härte
 Neue Deutsche Todeskunst

References

External links 
 IchWillSpass.de - Die Neue Deutsche Welle im Internet 
 Punk-Disco - Discographies of many German punk and NDW bands. 
 Back Again – many Infos about NDW Bands 
 Neue Deutsche Welle on Avant-Avant.net

 
German styles of music
Rock music genres
New wave music
1970s neologisms
1970s in West Germany
1980s in West Germany